"Crazy from the Heart" is a song written by David Bellamy and Don Schlitz, and recorded by American country music duo The Bellamy Brothers.  It was released in August 1987 as the first single and title track from the album Crazy from the Heart.  The song reached number 3 on the Billboard Hot Country Singles & Tracks chart.
The song was released as a duet with Chris Hillman on the Angels and Outlaws album in 2005.

Chart performance

References

1987 singles
1987 songs
The Bellamy Brothers songs
Chris Hillman songs
Songs written by Don Schlitz
Song recordings produced by Emory Gordy Jr.
MCA Records singles
Curb Records singles
Songs written by David Bellamy (singer)